The teams competing in Group 2 of the 2013 UEFA European Under-21 Championship qualifying competition were Finland, Lithuania, Malta, Slovenia, Sweden and Ukraine.

Standings

Results and fixtures

Goalscorers
5 goals

 Terence Vella
 Dejan Lazarević
 Mikael Ishak
 Serhiy Rybalka

4 goals

 Robert Berić
 Pylyp Budkivskiy

3 goals

 Lauri Dalla Valle
 Mervan Çelik
 Roman Bezus
 Yevhen Shakhov

2 goals

 Aurimas Vilkaitis
 Rowen Muscat
 Enej Jelenič
 Astrit Ajdarević
 Jiloan Hamad
 Rasmus Jönsson
 Andriy Bohdanov
 Dmytro Korkishko

1 goal

 Petteri Forsell
 Juho Lähde
 Timi Lahti
 Tero Mäntylä
 Joel Pohjanpalo
 Roope Riski
 Mikko Sumusalo
 Tim Väyrynen
 Martynas Dapkus
 Tadas Eliošius
 Marius Miškinis
 Donatas Nakrošius
 Arvydas Novikovas
 Simonas Paulius
 Artūras Žulpa
 Zach Muscat
 Kevin Kampl
 Matic Maruško
 Matej Podlogar
 Rajko Rep
 Samuel Armenteros
 John Guidetti
 Jakob Johansson
 Alexander Milošević
 Dmytro Hrechyshkin
 Temur Partsvaniya

1 own goal
 Artūras Žulpa (playing against Finland)

References

External links
Standings and fixtures at UEFA.com

Group 2
Sports competitions in Trelleborg
2011 in Swedish football
2012 in Swedish football
International association football competitions hosted by Sweden
International association football competitions hosted by Finland
2011 in Finnish football
2012 in Finnish football